Baira Khanpur is a village and Gram panchayat in Bilhaur Tehsil, Kanpur Nagar district, Uttar Pradesh, India. It is located 68 kilometers away from Kanpur Central railway station.

References

Villages in Kanpur Nagar district